The British Rail Class 318 is an electric multiple-unit (EMU) passenger train which operates in west central Scotland. They were also used on the Inverclyde Line in small numbers. The trains currently operate Argyle Line (including services to Lanark from Glasgow Central High Level), Cathcart Circle Line, North Clyde Line, Whifflet Line and Inverclyde Line services. Following the withdrawal of the  fleet in 2019, these units are the oldest working EMUs in Scotland, having been in revenue-earning service for more than  years.

Background and history 

Effectively a 3-car version of the Class 317, 21 of these British Rail Mark 3-based units were built by BREL York works between 1985–1986 to replace the elderly Class 101, Class 107, Class 120 and Class 126 diesel multiple units (DMUs) which had worked the Glasgow South Western sector for nearly 30 years. The technical description of the units are DTSO+MSO+DTSO, consisting of a central motor car (with a roof mounted Stone Faiveley AMBR pantograph and four Brush TM2141 traction motors located under the floor within both bogies (two motors per bogie)) with a driving trailer at either end. The units run on the standard 25 kV AC overhead line system, and are standard-class throughout.

The 318 can also operate in multiple with the slightly newer Class 320 in a six-car formation, regularly used on the North Clyde and Argyle Lines. Upon the introduction of the Class 334s on Ayrshire/Inverclyde routes in 2001, both the 334 and 318 were found operating these lines together.

There were two named units: 318259 Citizens' Network and 318266 Strathclyder. Both were denamed during the 2013-2017 refurbishment.

Accidents and incidents 

 In July 1995, units 318254 and 318262 were operating a Glasgow Central to Largs service when a braking system failure resulted in the train overshooting the end of the platform at Largs railway station. The train crashed through shops at the front of the station, and out into Main Street, Largs. As it was very early in the morning, there were no serious injuries. The cab of vehicle 77244 (from set 318254) needed to be completely rebuilt, but 318262 managed to move by rail back to Shields depot. The reconstruction of the station building took almost ten years to complete.
 On 3 September 2007 The last carriage of unit 318254 was derailed at low speed as it passed over facing points between Exhibition Centre and Anderston stations, Glasgow. The carriage tilted over and came to rest at an angle of approximately 75 degrees against the tunnel wall.
 On 16 January 2008, unit 318267 was involved in a minor collision at Glasgow Central station. Class 334 unit 334017 was working the 08:24 passenger service from  when it collided with the empty, stationary 318 while preparing to terminate at Glasgow Central. The 334 was in the process of braking and was travelling at less than  when the collision occurred. Four passengers were slightly injured,  of whom one required hospital attention.
 On 7 May 2022, a Class 320 (320309) and a Class 318 (318262) derailed between Blairhill and Coatbridge Sunnyside. The train was an empty coaching stock running from Yoker C.S to Shields TMD and was going via the North Clyde due to the Argyle line being closed. Nobody was injured.

Refurbishment

2005-2007 refurbishment 

Between 2005 and 2007, all Class 318s underwent a refurbishment by Hunslet-Barclay which involved the removal of the corridor connection on the driver's cars allowing the provision of a full-width driver's cab. The passenger accommodation was also improved, with new passenger door controls, a repainted interior, new seat moquette and flooring, and new grab handles. New lighting was also fitted, with similar shades to the Class 320 units along with LED lights for cab indicators and marker lights. New passenger information systems, similar to those seen on other trains, were installed.

In September 2008 the Scottish Government's agency Transport Scotland announced that all ScotRail trains (including from the Strathclyde Partnership for Transport) would eventually be repainted in a new blue livery with white Saltire markings on the carriage ends. Since the units had recently been refurbished and repainted, they would be the last in the EMU fleet to be repainted in Saltire livery. In the interim, all units had their "SPT Rail" naming removed, leaving them with an unbranded SPT livery.

2013-2017 refurbishment 

The Class 318 units received a second refurbishment between October 2013 and October 2017.

The work included:
 Repainting into ScotRail saltire livery.
 An internal refurbishment that included an internal repaint, new floor vinyl and new blue 'saltire' seat coverings.
 Fluorescent lights replaced with LED lighting.
 New floor-level lighting in the door vestibules.
 Small toilet replaced with a large accessible toilet, as recently fitted to the Class 320 fleet.
 Corrosion repairs to bodywork (as the units generally operated on Ayrshire coast services initially, they were frequently exposed to sea water during inclement weather).

The refurbishment programme of the Class 318 fleet was completed in October 2017.

Fleet details

References

Further reading

318
318
25 kV AC multiple units
Train-related introductions in 1986